Aphanostephus pilosus is a North American species of flowering plants in the family Asteraceae, with the common name hairy lazydaisy. It is found only in Oklahoma and in northern Texas.

Aphanostephus pilosus is an annual herb up to 30 cm (12 inches) tall. It grows in sandy soil in woodlands and by roadsides.

References

Astereae
Flora of Texas
Plants described in 1862
Flora of Oklahoma
Flora without expected TNC conservation status